Luis Jiménez may refer to:
José Luis Jiménez (born 1983), Chilean football player
Luis Antonio Jiménez (born 1984), Chilean football player
Luis Jiménez (bishop) (1586–1636), Spanish Roman Catholic bishop
Luis Jiménez (first baseman) (born 1982), Venezuelan baseball player
Luis Jiménez (third baseman) (born 1988), Dominican baseball player
Luis Jiménez (fencer) (born 1928), Mexican Olympic fencer
Luis Jiménez (sculptor) (1940–2006), American sculptor
Luis Jiménez (sport shooter) (born 1924), Mexican Olympic shooter
Luis Jiménez (radio host) (born 1970), Puerto Rican radio talk show host
Luis Jiménez (basketball) (born 1962), Venezuelan basketball player
Luis Jiménez (volleyball) (born 1947), Cuban volleyball player
 Luis Jiménez Aranda (1845–1928), Spanish-French painter
Luis Jiménez Barrera (born 1987), Chilean football player
Luis Jiménez de Asúa (1889–1970), Spanish jurist and politician